The 2009 Copa Latina was first edition of the annual women's volleyball tournament, organized by the Peruvian Volleyball Federation, played by four countries from May 14-18, 2009 in Lima, Peru.

Competing Nations

Purpose
 participated in the tournament as preparation for the 2009 Pan-American Cup.
 send the national youth team (U18) as preparation for the 2009 Youth World Championship
 participated in the tournament as preparation for the 2009 South American Championship.
 participated in the tournament as preparation for the 2009 South American Championship.

Preliminary round

|}

Matches

|}

Final round

Bronze medal match

|}

Gold medal match

|}

Final standing

References

P
Voll
Volleyball